Pabstiella syringodes is a species of orchid plant native to Colombia.

References 

syringodes
Flora of Colombia